Mahambo is a town and commune in Madagascar. It belongs to the district of Fenerive Est, which is a part of Analanjirofo Region. The population of the commune was estimated to be approximately 26,000 in 2001 commune census.

Primary and junior level secondary education are available in town. The majority 80% of the population of the commune are farmers.  The most important crops are rice and bananas, while other important agricultural products are cloves and lychee.  Services provide employment for 17% of the population. Additionally fishing employs 3% of the population.

Rivers
Mahambo lies at the river Iazafo.

References  

Populated places in Analanjirofo